Numerous castles (Burgen) and palaces (Schlösser) are found in the German state of Saxony. These buildings, some of which have a history of over 1000 years, were the setting of historical events, domains of famous personalities and are still imposing buildings to this day.

This list encompasses buildings described in German as Burg (castle), Schloss (palace or stately home), Festung (fort/fortress), Herrenhaus (manor house) and Palais/Palast (palace). After the middle ages many of these buildings were remodelled or built as royal or ducal palaces or as stately homes rather than as fortified buildings.

Bautzen District
 Körse Castle, Kirschau
 Neschwitz Baroque Castle, Neschwitz
 Ortenburg, Bautzen
 Rammenau Baroque Castle, Rammenau
 Hermsdorf Castle, Hermsdorf (bei Dresden) (municipality Ottendorf-Okrilla)
 Königsbrück Castle, Königsbrück
 Klippenstein Castle, Radeberg

Görlitz District
  Karlsfried Castle, Lückendorf
 Landeskrone
 Schloss Muskau, Bad Muskau
 Burg- und Klosteranlage Oybin, Oybin

Leipzig District
 Colditz Castle, near Dresden
 Dornreichenbach Castle, Dornreichenbach
 Gnandstein Castle, Gnandstein
 Wiprechtsburg Groitzsch, Groitzsch
 Kohren-Sahlis Castle, Kohren-Sahlis
 Mutzschen Castle, Mutzschen
 Frohburg Castle, Frohburg
 Altranstädt Castle, Altranstädt

Meissen District
 Albrechtsburg, Meißen
 Batzdorf Castle, Klipphausen
 Fasanenschlösschen, Moritzburg
 Gana Castle, Stauchitz
 Heynitz Castle, Nossen
 Hirschstein Castle, Hirschstein
  Hoflößnitz Castle, Radebeul
 Moritzburg Castle, Moritzburg
 Nossen Castle, Nossen
 Oberau Castle, Oberau (Saxony)
 Proschwitz Castle, Meißen
 Scharfenberg Castle, Klipphausen
 Schleinitz Castle, Leuben-Schleinitz
 Schönfeld Castle, Schönfeld (Saxony)
 Seußlitz Baroque Castle, Diesbar-Seußlitz
 Siebeneichen Castle, Meißen
 Lustschlösschen Spitzhaus, Radebeul
 Wackerbarths Ruh Castle, Radebeul
 Weistropp Castle, Weistropp

Middle Saxony District

 Kempe Castle, Roßwein
 Mildenstein Castle, Leisnig
 Wunderburg, Roßwein
 Augustusburg Hunting Lodge, Augustusburg
 Bieberstein Castle, Bieberstein
 Frauenstein Castle, Frauenstein
 Freudenstein Castle, Freiberg
 Gleichenstein Castle, Braunsdorf
 Lichtenwalde Castle, Niederwiesa
 Purschenstein Castle, Neuhausen/Erzgeb.
 Weißenborn Castle, Weißenborn/Erzgeb.
 Reinsberg Castle, Reinsberg (Saxony)
 Kriebstein Castle, Kriebstein
 Rochlitz Castle, Rochlitz
 Rochsburg, Rochsburg
 Wechselburg Castle, Wechselburg
 Ehrenberg Castle, Kriebstein
 Sachsenburg Castle, Frankenberg/Sa.

Northern Saxony District
 Delitzsch Castle, Delitzsch
 Eilenburg Castle, Eilenburg
 Hartenfels Castle, Torgau
 Hubertusburg Castle, Wermsdorf)
 Dahlen Castle, Dahlen
 Börln Castle, Börln
 Großböhla Castle, Großböhla

Ore Mountains District
 Hoheneck Castle, Stollberg
 Liebenstein Castle, Pobershau
 Scharfenstein Castle, Scharfenstein (municipality Drebach)
 Schlettau Castle, Schlettau
 Schwarzenberg Castle, Schwarzenberg
 Wildeck Castle, Zschopau
 Wolkenstein Castle, Wolkenstein

Saxon Switzerland-Eastern Ore Mountains District

 Alter Wildenstein
 Altrathen Castle, Rathen
 Arnstein Castle
 Bärenstein Castle
 Burgk Castle, Freital
 Dohna Castle, Dohna
 Friedrichschlößchen and Baroque Garden, Großsedlitz,  Großsedlitz
 Grillenburg Hunting Lodge, Tharandt
 Grimmstein, Schlottwitz
 Hohnstein Castle, Hohnstein
 Jochhöhschlösschen, Pesterwitz
 Königstein Fortress, Königstein
 Kuckuckstein Castle, Liebstadt
 Lauenstein Castle
 Neuer Wildenstein
 Neurathen Castle, Rathen
 Nöthnitz Castle, Bannewitz
 Hunting Lodge Rehefeld, Rehefeld-Zaunhaus
 Reinhardtsgrimma Castle, Reinhardtsgrimma
 Sonnenstein Castle, Pirna
 Stolpen Castle, Stolpen
 Tharandt Castle, Tharandt
 Schloss Weesenstein, Weesenstein
 Winterstein, also Hinteres Raubschloß, Ottendorf
 Zuschendorf Castle, Pirna

Vogtland District
 Hradschin Castle
 Jößnitz Castle
 Elsterberg Castle, Elsterberg
 Renaissance Castle of Göltzsch, Rodewisch
 Leubnitz Castle, Leubnitz (Vogtland)
 Mylau Castle, Mylau
 Netzschkau Castle, Netzschkau
 Schönberg Castle, Bad Brambach
 Unteres Schloss, Ellefeld
 Voigtsberg Castle, Oelsnitz (Vogtland)
 Treuen Castle, Treuen

Zwickau District
 Osterstein Castle
 Planitz Castle
 Blankenhain Castle, Crimmitschau
 Forderglauchau Castle, Glauchau
 Hinterglauchau Castle, Glauchau
 Hartenstein Castle, Hartenstein
 Stein Castle, Hartenstein
 Schloss Wolfsbrunn, Hartenstein (a former villa, not a castle or palace)
 Isenburg, Bad Schlema
 Lauterbach Castle, Neukirchen/Pleiße
 Leubnitz Castle, Werdau
 Lichtenstein Castle Lichtenstein
 Schönfels Castle, Lichtentanne
 Schweinsburg, Neukirchen/Pleiße
 Steinpleiss Castle, Werdau
 Wiesenburg Castle, Wildenfels
 Wildenfels Castle, Wildenfels
 Wolkenburg Castle, Limbach-Oberfrohna

City of Dresden (urban district, state capital) 
 Albrechtsberg Castle
 Eckberg Castle
 Lingnerschloss (alias "Villa Stockhausen")
 Nickern Castle
 Pillnitz Castle
 Royal Residence
 Zwinger Palace

City of Leipzig (urban district) 
 Gohliser Schlösschen
 Pleißenburg

City of Chemnitz (urban district) 
 Chemnitz Castle
 Rabenstein Castle
 Klaffenbach Water Castle

References

See also
List of castles
List of castles in Germany